Radio Kantipur or Kantipur FM is a Nepalese FM radio station, established in October 1998. It currently operates in the eastern, central, western, mid-western and far-western development regions. It is most popular in eastern region and in Kathmandu. It provides news and entertainment programs 24 hours a day. In 2007 it started nationwide transmission on two frequencies – 96.1 MHz in the east and central regions and 101.8 MHz in the west. Additionally, it is available via the internet at www.radiokantipur.com/live .

Relay Stations
 96.1 in Kathmandu
 96.1 in Bhedetar Dhankuta
 96.1 in Birgunj, Parsa
 96.1 in Bharatpur, Chitwan
 96.1 in Bhairahawa, Rupandehi
 101.8 in Nepalgunj, Banke
 101.8 in Pokhara, Kaski
 101.8 in Dhangadi, Kailali

Availability
Kantipur FM programming is available online through these websites:
 Radio Kantipur Live
 LiveFMs.com

See also
 Hits FM (Nepal)

References

External links
 eKantipur.com Official site of Kantipur Daily.

Radio stations in Nepal
1998 establishments in Nepal